Irina Nikolayevna Rosikhina (born 11 May 1975, Kamensk-Shakhtinsky) is a Russian retired  sprinter who specializes in the 400 metres.

Her coaches were Anatoly Georgievich Timofeev and later Viktor Vasilyevich Pushkin.

Achievements

Personal bests
200 metres - 23.31 s (2005)
400 metres - 50.66 s (2004)

References

External links

1975 births
Living people
Russian female sprinters
World Athletics Championships medalists
Goodwill Games medalists in athletics
Sportspeople from Rostov Oblast
Competitors at the 1998 Goodwill Games